The 1972 Chesterfield 250 was an endurance race for Series Production Touring Cars complying with CAMS Group E regulations. The race, which was Round 1 of the 1972 Australian Manufacturers' Championship, was held at the Adelaide International Raceway near Virginia in South Australia on 27 August 1972 over 165 laps, totalling 247.5 miles. The field was divided into four classes, split via "CP Units", where the engine capacity of the vehicle (in litres) was multiplied by the retail price of the vehicle (in dollars) to give a CP Unit (i.e. Capacity Price Unit) value.

Results were as follows:

References

Australian Motor Racing Annual, 1973
Official Programme, Adelaide International Raceway, 27 August 1972
Racing Car News, October 1972
The Advertiser, Monday, 28 August 1972
The Australian Racing History of Ford, ©1989
The Official Racing History of Holden, © 1988

Auto races in Australia
Chesterfield 250
Sports competitions in Adelaide
1970s in Adelaide